Kim Tae-ho may refer to:

 Kim Tae-ho (boxer) (born 1952), South Korean boxer
 Kim Tae-ho (politician) (born 1962), prime minister-designate of South Korea
 Kim Tae-ho (television director) (born 1975), South Korean television director
 Kim Tae-ho (footballer) (born 1989), South Korean footballer